Canbelego is a village in the Orana region of New South Wales, Australia. It is now virtually a ghost town but was once a much larger settlement associated with the Mount Boppy Gold Mine. At the 2016 census, the population of Canbelego, including its surrounding area, was 39, but the village itself had only four residents in early 2020. In 1905, the population had been around 1,500, with around 300 of these being employees of the mine. Between 1907 and 1917, the population was around 2,000.

Location 
It is located approximately 640 km north-west of Sydney, 50 km east of Cobar and 5km south of the nearest point on the Barrier Highway.

History

Aboriginal and early settler history 
The area now known as Canbelego is part of the traditional lands of the Wangaaypuwan dialect speakers (also known as Wangaibon) of the Ngiyampaa people. 

The Surveyor-General Thomas Mitchell and his expedition had camped and obtained water, in early 1845, at a place that he called "Canbelego" but that was not the later site of the village; it was a location—on the Bogan river and near to the modern-day locality of Grahweed—about 30 km from Nyngan. As Mitchell tried to use local language names whenever possible, it is likely that the name Canbelego is derived from the local aboriginal dialect. Grahweed and the later site of Canbelego lie at opposite ends of area of the County of Canbelego, and it is likely that the village took its name from the county.

After settler colonisation, the area of the village was partly within Robinson County (Parish of Cohn) and partly within Canbelego County (Parish of Florida).

Mount Boppy Gold Mine 

The original Mount Boppy Gold Mine operated from 1901 to 1922. It was, at the time, regarded as being the largest gold producer in New South Wales. Over that period, the mine produced 13.5 tons (433,000 ounces) of gold. After reef mining ceased in 1922, the old company reprocessed tailings until finally closing the site and selling off equipment in 1923.   

Between 1929 and 1941, there was minor production of gold from remnant ore and attempts to process tailings. Around 500,000 tonnes of tailings—still containing an average of 3g of gold per tonne—were left on the surface. Starting in 1974, these tailings were reprocessed to recover more gold. In recent years, the mine was reopened as an open-cut operation  but later placed under care and maintenance.  

It is estimated that over its entire life, from hard-rock mining and tailings reprocessing, the mine has produced 500,000 ounces of gold. Only with the opening of the New Occidental mine at Wrightville, near Cobar, in the 1930s, did the Mount Boppy mine lose its place as the most productive gold mine in New South Wales. 

In 2020, drilling revealed intersections of high-grade gold-bearing ore below the bottom of the existing pit. Gold was again being mined there in 2021, and that was expected to continue, until 2022, together with limited mine site rehabilitation.

Other mines 
Other nearby mines included the Canbelego Copper Mining Co. (also known as 'the Burra', located 5 miles south of the village), The North Mount Boppy Gold Mining Co., and the Restdown Copper Mining Co. (15 miles south-east of Canbelego). The deposit that was formerly associated with the Canbelego Copper Mining Co. and later Canbelego Copper Mines Limited—mined between 1906 and 1914—is once again, in 2022, the focus of exploration as a copper resource.

Mining village 

The village of Canbelego was proclaimed in December 1902. By mid-1904, the rapidly growing population had reached around 900, with 180 employed at the Mt Boppy Mine. The post office opened in 1901, predating the village and was originally named Mount Boppy Mines. The public school, established in 1901, had an enrollment of 158, and an average attendance of 120. The main street, Edward Street, had three hotels, six stores, two butchers, a baker, blacksmith, billiard saloon, cool drink shops, many boarding houses, a post office, and a court house under construction. There was also a local doctor. The first of its church buildings, the Presbyterian Church, was shared when necessary with other denominations, pending other churches being built. All the houses in the town were neat houses of weatherboard construction, not the temporary structures common in mining towns of that time. On the outskirts of the village, a sawmill was busy cutting timber for building work in the growing village. By 1907, the population had reached around 2,000.

From around 1906, the village  had its own horse racing course and race meetings were held there on New Year's Day until the racing club was wound up in 1912. In 1908, a second school, a Catholic Convent School was opened, with four Sisters of St. Joseph and 70 pupils.

Australian War Memorial records show five men from Canbelego went to the First World War. One of them, John Bray, perhaps unsurprisingly for a miner, was a sapper in the 3rd Tunnelling Company, A.I.F., when he was killed in France in 1916. Only one of these five men survived the war. However, a contemporaneous report states that Canbelego had raised three contingents of volunteer recruits—the last of consisting of eight young men—by September 1915. A roll of honour memorial from Canbelego lists the names of 71 men, of whom 14 had died in the war.

In 1917, the population was said to be around 2000 but, in February of that year, hard rock mining was suspended at the Mt Boppy Gold Mine, possibly an early sign that the future of the mine was in doubt. The population began to decline. 

In July 1919, Canbelego suffered a serious outbreak of Spanish Influenza. Most of the community were infected—temporarily closing the mine and overwhelming the small hospital—resulting in at least nine deaths in one week. 

Water was precious in the semi-arid environment, with enormous amounts being needed for the processing operations. The mine had a 13 million gallon dam, condensed the exhaust steam from its steam engines for return to the boilers, and distilled brackish mine water. In the early 1920s, the area was subject to a long drought, which affected mining operations at the Mt Boppy mine.

The final closure of the Mount Boppy Gold Mine, in 1922-1923, was the beginning of the end of Canbelego's prosperity. By this time, the population was down to around 1,000, but it rapidly fell still further, without a major source of employment in the area. A few years later, in 1925, it was reported that, "a handful is left hanging on in hope that the old field will come again" and in 1929, "there are very few houses and shops in Canbelego". The convent school had closed at the end of 1923. Limited gold production between 1929 and 1941 allowed the village to persist, with diminished circumstances. In 1931, the population was still 261 and the village had one hotel, two stores, two butchers, a bakery, and a school with 40 pupils. By 1949, there were only 93 inhabitants left. In 1938, the village—by then described as "one hotel and cluster of houses"— briefly relived its former glory, when its Country Rugby Leaque team—the smallest club of the 500 in the state—won 20 of its 22 games, and had another successful year in 1940. The team was still in existence in the 1950s. The old Commercial Hotel was destroyed by fire in 1956 but a new hotel opened in 1959. 

By 1962, almost all that was left of the facilities of the village were the hotel, public school—with a few pupils, each of whom planted a tree in the school grounds that year—and the post office. The school closed in 1969. The post office closed in 1987. The 'new' Commercial Hotel burned down in 1990, and this time it was not rebuilt.

Boppy Mount 
Boppy Mount (also known as Boppy Mountain)—4.5 km by road to the north-west of the village—was the railway station for Canbelego on the Cobar railway line. The railway station opened in July 1892. There was a hamlet there, in the very early 20th century, and a post office until around 1957. It lay close to the landform Mount Boppy. In the days before motorised road transport, the railway at Boppy Mount was vital to the area around Canbelego, not only for the mining community but also to ship wool grown in the surrounding area.

There was another platform, at a siding called Florida, located to the north of the village.

Remnants 
The village no longer has any public facilities or services. Edward Street, the main street of the village, other streets of the old village, and allotments still appear on maps but the land is now mainly vacant, and much of it owned by the Cobar Shire. Recent mining activity has had only a very small impact in arresting Canbelego's decline. 

There is a lonely and neglected cemetery to the north-west of the old village. West of the village are the remains of the mine and the open-cut pit, now a potential source of clean water, for industrial use and watering stock, in times of drought. 

The village's First World War roll of honour is now kept at the Cobar Memorial Services Club. Also in Cobar, a restored 15-head stamper battery from the old Mount Boppy Gold Mine is on display at the Cobar Miners' Heritage Park. Photographs and documents relating to the village and its mines are held in the N.S.W. State Archives Collection.

The railway still exists but is for freight only. The station, Boppy Mount, no longer exists, although its former location is now a stop for N.S.W. TrainLink road coach services.  

A road provides Canbelego's connection to the Barrier Highway. Canbelego's location, off the Barrier Highway, means that it sees little passing traffic.

See also 

 Canbelego County
 Robinson County

Reference section

External links

 Map of the village of Canbelego (1910)

Towns in New South Wales
Mining towns in New South Wales
Ghost towns in New South Wales
Cobar Shire
Gold mines in New South Wales